David William Rogers (born July 1, 1965) is an American politician from the state of North Carolina. He is a former Republican member of the North Carolina House of Representatives, who represented the 112th district (including constituents in Rutherford and Burke counties) from 2016 to 2023. He was first appointed to the chamber in August 2016.

Rogers is listed as one of the most conservative members of the North Carolina legislature. Rogers is an attorney, and was admitted to the North Carolina Bar in 1991. He earned his JD from the University of Tulsa and his BS from Oral Roberts University.

Electoral history

2022

2020

2018

2016

2002

Committee assignments

2021-2022 session
Appropriations
Appropriations - Justice and Public Safety (Vice Chair)
Judiciary III (Chair)
Wildlife Resources
Election Law and Campaign Finance Reform
Marine Resources and Aqua Culture
Redistricting

2019-2020 session
Appropriations
Appropriations - Justice and Public Safety
Judiciary (Vice Chair)
Homeland Security, Military, and Veterans Affairs
Health
Wildlife Resources

2017-2018 session
Appropriations
Appropriations - Capital
Appropriations - Justice and Public Safety
Judiciary I
Education - K-12
Energy and Public Utilities
Health

References

External links
David Rogers at Ballotpedia
Project Vote Smart – Representative David Rogers (NC) profile
Our Campaigns – Representative David Rogers (NC) profile

Living people
1965 births
People from Cleveland
People from Rutherfordton, North Carolina
Oral Roberts University alumni
University of Tulsa College of Law alumni
Republican Party members of the North Carolina House of Representatives
21st-century American politicians